Garnqueen railway station served the suburb of Garnqueen, North Lanarkshire, Scotland, from 1849 to 1851 on the Monkland and Kirkintilloch Railway.

History 
The station was opened on 10 December 1849 by the Monkland Railways. It was a short-lived station, only being open for two years, closing on 10 December 1851.

References 

Disused railway stations in North Lanarkshire
Railway stations in Great Britain opened in 1849
Railway stations in Great Britain closed in 1851
1849 establishments in Scotland
1851 disestablishments in Scotland